Adam Robitel (born May 26, 1978) is an American film director, producer, screenwriter, and actor. He is best known for directing horror films, such as The Taking of Deborah Logan (2014), Insidious: The Last Key (2018), Escape Room (2019) and its sequel Escape Room: Tournament of Champions (2021). He also co-wrote Paranormal Activity: The Ghost Dimension (2015).

Deadline Hollywood reported in July 2021, Robitel and co-writer Gavin Heffernan had partnered with Darren Aronofsky on a thriller series for Netflix entitled The Craving.

In July 2019, Deadline Hollywood posted that Heffernan and Robitel had teamed up with Sam Raimi on an "Untitled Supernatural Thriller" for Sony Pictures.

Education
Adam Robitel was born on May 28, 1978.
Robitel is a graduate of the USC School of Cinematic Arts.

Personal life
Robitel was raised Catholic. He was a gymnast who first pursued acting while at USC. His spec script, The Bloody Benders, garnered the attention of Guillermo Del Toro, and was his first official optioned property.

He credits his grandmother, who raised him and his sister on ghost stories, for his love of all things macabre. Robitel has been with his partner Ray, for twenty years.

Filmography

Acting roles

References

External links
 

1978 births
Living people
20th-century American male actors
21st-century American male actors
American male film actors
American gay actors
American male screenwriters
English-language film directors
Film directors from Massachusetts
Film producers from Massachusetts
Horror film directors
LGBT film directors
American LGBT screenwriters
Male actors from Massachusetts
People from Revere, Massachusetts
USC School of Cinematic Arts alumni
Screenwriters from Massachusetts
21st-century American screenwriters
21st-century American male writers
21st-century LGBT people